KDET (930 AM) is a radio station broadcasting a news/talk/information format. Licensed to Center, Texas, United States, the station serves the Center-Nacogdoches area. The station is currently owned by Center Broadcasting Company.

KDET began broadcasting in February 1949 under the ownership of Tom Foster and the management of Robert Jackson "Jack" Bell. From then until the year 2000, its highly successful format catered to the farmers, ranchers, sportsmen, and small-town residents of Deep East Texas and Northwestern Louisiana.

Chief star of KDET from 1966 until 2000 was Jack Everett "Jack Mack" McLendon who, while known to his listeners for his early-morning show including a crowing rooster at sign-on and the school lunch menus in rhyme, was also the most prolific producer of advertising on KDET. Jack Mack's cousin Mattie Imelda McLendon Dellinger talked to listeners with her call-in show "Mattie's Partyline" in the 1990s and early 2000s.

References

External links

DET
News and talk radio stations in the United States